Acetobacter malorum is a bacterium. Its type strain is LMG 1746T (= DSM 14337T).

References

Further reading

Sagarzazu, Noelia Isabel, et al. "Optimization of denaturing high performance liquid chromatography technique for rapid detection and identification of acetic acid bacteria of interest in vinegar production." Acetic Acid Bacteria 2.1s (2013): e5.

External links

LPSN
Type strain of Acetobacter malorum at BacDive -  the Bacterial Diversity Metadatabase

Rhodospirillales
Bacteria described in 2002